János Vajda (7 May 1827 – 18 January 1897) was a Hungarian poet and journalist. His first poetry was published in Életképek in 1844.  He was a member of the Kisfaludy Society.

References

External links
 

1827 births
1897 deaths
19th-century Hungarian poets
Hungarian male poets
19th-century Hungarian male writers